Anastasia Absolutely (1995) is a young-adult novel by Lois Lowry. It is part of a series of books that Lowry wrote about Anastasia and her younger brother Sam.

Critical reception
The School Library Journal said "The plot is pretty far-fetched and the dog-doo dilemma packs only so much humor. The Values class assignments tagged to the end of each chapter--scenarios drawn from modern life--are also a letdown. The wishy-washy responses from Anastasia and her family reveal neither humor nor depth of thought and are out of character from the Krupniks we have come to know. While children have come to expect more from this very talented author, the book is packed with believable dialogue and references to current groups and situations."

See also

Lois Lowry

References

External links
 Description from Lowry's website.
Lowry's website
Complete list of books by Lowry

1995 American novels
American young adult novels
Novels by Lois Lowry